Karabudzhak or Karabudzhakh or Karabudzhag or Karabudshach or Karabujakh may refer to:
Axtaçı, Kurdamir, Azerbaijan
Kür Qarabucaq, Azerbaijan 
Qarabucaq
Qarabucaq (Northern Kurdamir), Azerbaijan
Qarabucaq (Southern Kurdamir), Azerbaijan